Leonardo Borgese (20 December 1904 – 17 June 1986) was an Italian painter. His work was part of the painting event in the art competition at the 1932 Summer Olympics.

References

1904 births
1986 deaths
20th-century Italian painters
20th-century Italian male artists
Italian male painters
Olympic competitors in art competitions
Painters from Naples